The CRASH-B Sprints World Indoor Rowing Championships (CRASH-B Sprints) was the world championship for indoor rowing, raced over a distance of 2,000m.  The regatta is sponsored by Concept2, and raced on their C2 rowers.  Originally held in Harvard's Newell Boathouse, the regatta moved in turn to the Malkin Athletic Center, the Radcliff Quadrangle Athletic Center, MIT's Rockwell Cage, Harvard's Indoor Track Facility, the Reggie Lewis Track and Athletic Center, Boston University's Agganis Arena, and in 2019, to the Boston University Track and Tennis Center.  The regatta is held in late February each year.

Competitors are 12 years old and up, including adaptive categories.  In 2019 there was an age group for 90–94 years old.

The race was started in 1980 by a group of US Olympic and World Team rowers. The CRASH-B Sprints are officially sponsored by Concept 2.  Originally, the acronym for the race, C.R.A.S.H.-B., stood for the Charles River Association of Sculling Has-Beens. It was later changed to the Charles River All-Star Has-Beens. The racing format has evolved over the history of the event.  Now, all athletes race a single distance of 2,000 meters. Previously, the regatta involved multiple heats, finals, and longer distances (2,500 meters, 5 miles, and 6 miles).

Winners

*The fastest time of the day occurred in the Men's Heavyweight ages 40–49 category, in which Graham Benton won in a world record (for that category) time of 5:48.3.

References

External links

Concept2 CRASH-Bs page

Indoor rowing competitions